Proutiella jordani is a moth of the family Notodontidae first described by Hering in 1925.

Etymology
It is named for the German-British entomologist Karl Jordan.

External links
Species page at Tree of Life Web Project

Notodontidae
Moths described in 1925